RS3: Racing Simulation 3 is a 2002 racing video game developed by Ubi Soft Paris and published by Ubi Soft. It is a sequel to Monaco Grand Prix: Racing Simulation 2. It released for Microsoft Windows in December 2002. A PlayStation 2 port was released in October of the next year, albeit exclusively in Europe.

Gameplay
Racing Simulation 3 is a genericized approximation of the real life Formula One, but it lacks any officially licensed materials. Drivers and teams are given generic names. Track layouts are often authentic to real-world counterparts, but they are usually attributed to neighboring countries. For example, the Albert Park Circuit in Melbourne, Australia is instead located in New Zealand.  

Despite the previous title being named for the Monaco Grand Prix, Racing Simulation 3 lacks any representation of the Circuit de Monaco.

Notes

External links

2002 video games
Formula One video games
PlayStation 2 games
Racing simulators
Racing video games
Ubisoft games
Video games developed in France
Windows games